Parker Baldwin Vooris, Jr. (April 27, 1912 – 1989) was an American bobsledder who competed in the late 1950s. He won a gold medal in the four-man event at the 1959 FIBT World Championships in St. Moritz.

Notes

1912 births
1989 deaths
American male bobsledders